Angelo Andrés Espinosa Celis (born 197?), commonly referred as Angelo Espinoza, is a Chilean former professional football midfielder who played for clubs in Chile and Indonesia.

Career
Born in Santiago, in his country of birth, Espinosa played for Santiago Morning in the Primera B in 1997, making 24 appearances.

Abroad, he played in Indonesia for PSMS Medan (2001), Persib Bandung (2003–04), and Persiba Balikpapan (2005).

In Persib Bandung, he coincided with his compatriots Rodrigo Sanhueza, Alejandro Tobar, Claudio Lizama, Julio Lopez and the coach Juan Páez.

After football

References

External links
 

Date of birth missing (living people)
Living people
Footballers from Santiago
Chilean footballers
Chilean expatriate footballers
Santiago Morning footballers
PSMS Medan players
Persib Bandung players
Persiba Balikpapan players
Primera B de Chile players
Indonesian Premier Division players
Chilean expatriate sportspeople in Indonesia
Expatriate footballers in Indonesia
Association football midfielders
Year of birth missing (living people)